Jordi Puigneró i Ferrer (born 2 February 1974) is a Catalan IT engineer and politician from Catalonia. He served as Vice President of Spanish Autonomous Community of Catalonia and Minister of Digital Policies and Territory since May 2021 until 29 September 2022. He previously served between 2018 and 2021 as minister of Digital Policies and Public Administration of the Government of Catalonia. He is a member of Together for Catalonia (JUNTS) political party. He is considered the designer and architecture of the Catalan Digital Republic project.

Early life
Puigneró was born on 2 February 1974 in Sant Cugat del Vallès, Catalonia. He joined the University of Surrey in 1992, graduating in 1997 with a master's degree in information systems.

Career
Puigneró was a computer programmer/analyst at Deutsche Bank's IT department in Frankfurt from 1997 to 2000 and an information and communications technology consultant for IBM in Barcelona from 2000 to 2003. In 2003 he became chief-of-staff to Lluís Recoder, the mayor of Sant Cugat del Vallès. He was director-general of Telecommunications and the Information Society for the Generalitat de Catalunya from November 2013 to February 2016 when he was appointed Secretary of Telecommunications, Cybersecurity and Digital Society.

At the 2003 local elections Puigneró was placed 11th on the Convergence and Union (CiU) electoral alliance's list of candidates in Sant Cugat del Vallès but the alliance only managed to win 10 seats in the province and as a result he was not elected. However, following the death of Jaume Tubau i Grau he was appointed to the municipal council in September 2005. He was re-elected at the 2007 and 2011 local elections.

Puigneró was lead councillor for Institutional Relations, Participation and Civicism (2005–2011) and Communication, Internal Services and Innovation (2011). He was deputy mayor for Governance, Security, Mobility and Technology from 2011 to 2013. He was a member of the board of directors of LocalRet from 2007 to 2013. He was chairman of the Sant Cugat del Vallès branch of the Democratic Convergence of Catalonia (CDC) from 2009 to 2012. Puigneró did not contest the 2015 local elections but was placed third in the CiU's supplementary list of candidates in Sant Cugat del Vallès.

On 19 May 2018 newly elected President of Catalonia Quim Torra nominated a new government in which Puigneró was to be Minister of Digital Policies and Public Administration. He was sworn in on 2 June 2018 at the Palau de la Generalitat de Catalunya.

In July 2020 Puigneró joined the newly formed Together for Catalonia political party.

On 24 May 2021 he was named Vice President of Catalonia under the Aragonès Government and took office on 26 May, maintaining his position as Minister of Digital Policies and Public Administration.

Personal life
Between 2012 and 2014 Puigneró climbed the ten peaks in Catalonia over 3,000m.

Electoral history

References

External links
 
 

1974 births
Alumni of the University of Surrey
Catalan European Democratic Party politicians
Engineers from Catalonia
Convergence and Union politicians
Democratic Convergence of Catalonia politicians
Living people
Government ministers of Catalonia
Municipal councillors in the province of Barcelona
People from Sant Cugat del Vallès
Together for Catalonia (2020) politicians
Torra Government